The 1981–82 Kent Football League season was the 16th in the history of the Kent Football League, a football competition in England.
 
The league was won by Erith & Belvedere, who was promoted to the Southern Football League.

League table

The league featured 16 clubs which competed in the previous season, no new clubs joined the league this season.

League table

References

External links

1981-82
1981–82 in English football leagues